Ioannis Deligiannis (1815–1876) was a Greek politician. He was foreign minister (1874–1875) and minister of the interior (1876) in the Government of Greece.

References
Rulers.org

1815 births
1876 deaths
Foreign ministers of Greece
Ministers of the Interior of Greece